The electoral district of Monbulk is an electoral district of the Victorian Legislative Assembly. It is situated in the Dandenong Ranges on the outskirts of Melbourne. It includes the towns of Monbulk, Olinda and Silvan as well as some outer suburbs such as Belgrave and Tecoma.

The Puffing Billy Railway forms part of the boundary of the electorate, other tourist attractions within the electorate include Mount Dandenong and the Dandenong Ranges National Park, Yellingbo Nature Conservation Reserve and the Silvan Reservoir.

For its first three decades, it was a bellwether seat held by the party of government. It was held by the Liberals from 1967 to 1982 before falling to Labor in the landslide that brought John Cain to power.  The Liberals won it back in 1992 as Jeff Kennett won government.  While they held onto it in 1999 when Kennett was defeated by Steve Bracks, current Labor member James Merlino won it in 2002 and has held it since.  It appears to be trending toward Labor in recent years; Merlino held onto it in 2010 even as Labor lost government, and retained it on a healthy swing in 2014 when a redistribution made it notionally Liberal.  Merlino is the former Deputy Premier of Victoria - the second Deputy Premier to hold this seat after Bill Borthwick.

Members for Monbulk

Election results

References

External links
 Electorate profile: Monbulk District, Victorian Electoral Commission

Electoral districts of Victoria (Australia)
1967 establishments in Australia
Yarra Ranges
Shire of Cardinia
City of Knox